Francesco Antonio Bertucci (fl. 1595), was a Dalmatian Capuchin and Knight Hospitaller of disputed origin who served as the titular prior of the commandry of the Order at the monastery located in Vrana, a town in present-day Croatia. He is known for his remarkably consistent efforts to turn Habsburg-Ottoman Long War into crusade of Christian alliance against the Ottomans.

Originally from the town of Hvar, Bertucci was a relative of the Dalmatian poets Jerolim (Gerolamo) and Hortenzije Brtučević (Ortensio Bertucci).

Bertucci was a member of the Holy League of Pope Clement VIII.

In 1592 Bertucci was in Rome where he received Pope's order to catch and kill Marco Sciarra, the leader of rebels, which he did in April 1593.

Plans for Anti-Ottoman crusade 
Bertucci was at the heart of 1596 plans for the uprising in the eastern Adriatic region. According to some suggestions, the main reason for his anti-Ottoman activities were his plans to recapture the Priory of Vrana from Ottomans.

The contemporary Venetian sources and later sources that rely on them considered Bertucci as papal agent, while some other sources simply considered him as an adventurer who managed to achieve access to the Pope through emperor Ferdinand II. Elisabeth Springer, an Austrian scholar who studied the career of Bertucci, emphasize that Bertucci's earlier attempts to access the pope (before he gained support of Ferdinand II) aimed to convince him to inspire general anti-Ottoman uprising in the Balkans and organize an anti-Ottoman crusade (Holy League), were not successful. Springer further concluded that Bertucci was actually an agent of Holy Roman Empire who initially gained support of Archduke Ferdinand of Graz and later emperor Ferdinand II and members of his court, for his anti-Ottoman plans. According to Bertuccis plan, the rebels (including Uskoks) would first capture Klis, Herceg Novi and Scutari from the Ottomans. That would trigger large Ottoman naval expedition into north Adriatic and draw Venetians, who otherwise refused to join the crusade, to join the alliance against the Ottomans.

In the early 1590s the seat of anti-Ottoman conspiracy of Bertucci and his associates was in Ragusa. According to some rumours, the Republic of Ragusa was ready to expel them because the Ottomans offered them some benefits if they did. The seat of anti-Ottoman conspiracy was then moved to Split.

In 1595 Bertucci tried to convince  the Metropolitan of Cetinje Rufim Njeguš to accept union with Catholic Church.

Battle of Klis 
On 7 April 1596 a group of Uskoks who were Habsburg citizens and about thirty Venetian citizens attacked the Ottoman-held fortress of Klis (Battle of Klis (1596)) and captured it with the support of some members of the Ottoman garrison. The Habsburgs and Papal State joint troops, led personally by Antonio Bertucci, were sent to reinforce weak Christian garrison in the newly captured fortress. The releaf troops were supplied from the port of Senj. The Ottoman forces first defeated reinforcement troops and then reoccupied Klis. The Habsburg general who was supposed to lead relief troops blamed Bertucci for this defeat. Bertucci was captured during this battle and briefly held in Ottoman captivity until he was ransomed. This defeat had negative influence to his further attempts to convince Balkan Christian rulers to rebel against the Ottomans.

References

Sources

Further reading
 
 

Knights Hospitaller
Capuchins
16th-century Roman Catholic priests
People from Hvar (city)
Republic of Venice clergy
16th-century Croatian people
16th-century Albanian people
1626 deaths
Brtučević
16th-century Croatian military personnel